The Chewning Award is awarded every year to a member of the Christian Business Faculty Association who has been proven worthy and voted to receive it.

As stated on the CBFA website: "The Chewning Award was established by the Christian Business Faculty Association to perpetuate the passion and commitment of integrating personal faith and business as modeled by Dr. Richard C. Chewning. The award is bestowed no more than once annually to reinforce and encourage deserving individuals and to make their successes known among colleagues, students and the world at large."

Recipients

References 

American awards